San Rafael is one of the departments of Mendoza Province, Argentina. The seat of the department is in the city of San Rafael.

Statistics
Geographical location: 34° 15´ to 36° southern latitude and 70° 10´ to 66° 55´ eastern longitude.
Area: 31,235 km² (20.82% of the provincial area)
Extension: 204 km from north to south. 298 km from east to west
Altitude: 750 m above sea level.

Neighboring departments
North: San Carlos Department, Santa Rosa Department, Mendoza and La Paz Department, Mendoza
East: San Luis Province and General Alvear Department
South: La Pampa Province and Malargüe Department
West: Chile.

Administration
The department is subdivided in 18 districts: Ciudad, El Cerrito, Cuadro Nacional, Las Malvinas District, El Sosneado (added in 2005, it used to belong to Cuadro Benegas, but then it was added as a district), Las Paredes, La Llave, Cuadro Benegas, Cuadro Nacional, Cañada Seca, Goudge, Jaime Prats, Monte Comán, Rama Caída, Real del Padre, Punta del Agua, Villa Atuel and Villa 25 de Mayo.

External links
 Site of San Rafael government (In Spanish)
 Guide to the city of San Rafael (In Spanish)

Departments of Mendoza Province
States and territories established in 1805
Wine regions of Argentina
1805 establishments in the Spanish Empire